Nostradamus is a 1925 Italian silent historical film directed by Mario Roncoroni and starring Cello Bucchi in the title role of Nostradamus. It was one of the final film's released by the Unione Cinematografica Italiana which went bankrupt around this time.

Cast
 Nestore Aliberti
 Cellio Bucchi as Nostradmus 
 Gino-Lelio Comelli
 Liana Mirette
 Andrea Revkieff
 Alessandra Romanowa
 Ilda Sibiglia
 Maria Toschi
 Romilde Toschi
 Santina Toschi
 Vallina
 Emilio Vardannes
 Achille Vitti

References

Bibliography 
 Vittorio Martinelli. Il cinema muto italiano: I film degli anni venti, 1924-1931. Nuova ERI-Edizioni RAI, 1996.

External links 
 

1925 films
1920s historical films
Italian historical films
Italian silent feature films
1920s Italian-language films
Films directed by Mario Roncoroni
1920s Italian films